Rice's Woods is an archaeological site located at Canajoharie in Montgomery County, New York. S. L. Frey, the pioneer Mohawk Valley archaeologist, believed that the Mohawk village site in Rice's Woods, on Big Nose, was Canajorha, the Middle Castle of the Mohawks after about 1677. Other authorities believe that it was the Lower Castle at this same period.

It was listed on the National Register of Historic Places in 1980.

References

Archaeological sites on the National Register of Historic Places in New York (state)
Buildings and structures in Montgomery County, New York
Iroquois populated places
Former Native American populated places in the United States
Mohawk tribe
Native American history of New York (state)
National Register of Historic Places in Montgomery County, New York